Shavyady (Şawyaźı) is a rural locality (a village) and the administrative centre of Shavyadinsky Selsoviet, Baltachevsky District, Bashkortostan, Russia. The population was 269 as of 2010. There are 4 streets.

Geography 
Shavyady is located 18 km northwest of Starobaltachevo (the district's administrative centre) by road. Tibelevo is the nearest rural locality.

References 

Rural localities in Baltachevsky District